The carina of trachea (also: "tracheal carina") is a ridge of cartilage at the base of the trachea separating the openings of the left and right main bronchi.

Structure 
The carina is a cartilaginous ridge separating the left and right main bronchi that is formed by the inferior-ward and posterior-ward prolongation of the inferior-most tracheal cartilage.

The carina occurs at the lower end of the trachea - usually at the level of the 4th to 5th thoracic vertebra. This is in line with the sternal angle, but the carina may raise or descend up to two vertebrae higher or lower with breathing. The carina lies to the left of the midline, and runs antero-posteriorly (front to back).

Blood supply 
The bronchial arteries supply the carina and the rest of the lower trachea.

Relations 
The carina is around the area posterior to where the aortic arch crosses to the left of the trachea. The azygos vein crosses right to the trachea above the carina.

Physiology 
The mucous membrane of the carina is the most sensitive area of the trachea and larynx for triggering a cough reflex.

Clinical significance 
Tracheobronchial injury, an injury to the airways, occurs within 2.5 cm of the carina 60% of the time.

Diagnostic radiology 
Widening and distortion of the carina is a serious radiological sign that usually indicates carcinoma of the lymph nodes around the region where the trachea divides.

Additional images

References

External links

  - "Cast of trachea and bronchi, anterior view" (#2) 
 "Trachea and carina — tomogram, coronal plane" at SUNY Downstate Medical Center 
 Carina tracheae entry in the public domain NCI Dictionary of Cancer Terms

Trachea